Kamala Chatterjee School  or Kamala Chatterjee School for Girls is a school for girls in Fern Road, South Kolkata, West Bengal, India, affiliated to the West Bengal Board of Secondary Education for Madhyamik Pariksha (10th Board exams), and to the West Bengal Council of Higher Secondary Education for Higher Secondary Examination (12th Board exams). The school is named after its founder Kamala Chatterjee. The present Head Teacher is Sampa Mam (2015)
Founded in 1939

See also
Jagadbandhu Institution

References

High schools and secondary schools in West Bengal
Girls' schools in Kolkata
Educational institutions established in 1939
1939 establishments in India